Albert Wolstencroft (5 January 1898 – 1984) was an English footballer who made one professional appearance for Rochdale when they joined the English Football League in 1921. He previously played for Northwich Victoria.

References

Rochdale A.F.C. players
Northwich Victoria F.C. players
English footballers
1898 births
1984 deaths
Association football forwards